The women's 800 metres at the 2008 Summer Olympics took place on 15–18 August at the Beijing National Stadium.

The qualifying standards were 2:00.00 (A standard) and 2:01.30 (B standard).

Vanja Perišić of Croatia was later disqualified for failing an in-competition drugs test.

This would be the last Olympic appearance by Maria Mutola, a string which started with her as a 15 year old in the 1988 Olympics, a perennial finalist since 1992.  In the final, both Kenyan athletes went to the front, with World Champion Janeth Jepkosgei taking the front and teenager Pamela Jelimo following.  Coming out of the break, Kenia Sinclair in lane 3 squeezed quickly into lane 1, shutting the door on Mutola.  Just before the bell, Jelimo passed Jepkosgei and set off on her own.  Jepkosgei gave chase but the gap just continued to widen all the way to the finish.  Jelimo and Jepkosgei never saw a challenge to their gold and silver, behind them Sinclair, then Mutola gave an ever futile chase.  From almost the back of the pack, Hasna Benhassi moved forward through the turn.  Coming off the turn, Mutola was making her move on Sinclair and Benhassi was making her move on Mutola, the three athletes lined up shoulder to shoulder.  Benhassi had the speed while the other two struggled.  After being passed by Benhassi, Tatiana Andrianova followed her around the slowing athletes.  While Andrianova was faster down the straightaway, she couldn't make up enough ground, Benhassi finishing with bronze after taking silver in the previous three major championships.

Records
Prior to this competition, the existing world and Olympic records were as follows:

No new world or Olympic records were set for this event.

Results

Round 1
Qualification: First 3 in each heat(Q) and the next 6 fastest(q) advance to the semifinals.

Semifinals

Final

Splits

References

Athletics at the 2008 Summer Olympics
800 metres at the Olympics
2008 in women's athletics
Women's events at the 2008 Summer Olympics